Metar iznad asfalta (English: One Meter Above the Asphalt) is a 1998 debut album by Serbian pop singer Ana Stanić. She debuted as a solo artist with a song "Molila sam anđele" on Mediterranean Festival which was held in Budva. It was later released as her debut and first single off then-upcoming album, and it became very successful in the country, becoming her most notable and signature song to date. The album was released in summer 1998.

The album contains 11 songs, and 2 bonus tracks. The videos were shot for all four singles released off the album.

Track list 
 "Grad" — 3:41
 "Sunčan dan" — 3:43
 "Duh" — 3:53
 "Život je lep " — 4:04
 "Javi se" — 3:41
 "Točkovi" — 3:11
 "Sama" — 3:42
 "Ni veru ni ljubav" — 3:35
 "Prizori boje prošlosti" — 4:23
 "Zadnji sjaj" — 3:14
 "Molila sam anđele (Unplugged)" — 2:37

 "Grad (Goran Geto Mix)" — 3:44 (Bonus Track)
 "Molila sam anđele" — 3:58 (Bonus Track)

Notes  
 The Ana Stanić's song "Sama" contains melodic samples of the Neno Belan's song "Vino noći" (for verse melody), of the Zdravko Čolić's song "Ti si mi u krvi" (for chorus melody), and of the Pearl Jam's song "Alive" (for post-chorus melody).

External links 
 Official Website of Ana Stanić
 On: www.discogs.com

1998 albums